Công xã Paris Square ("Paris Commune Square") is a small square located in District 1, downtown Ho Chi Minh City, Vietnam. It lies between Lê Duẩn Boulevard and Nguyễn Du Street and surrounds the Notre-Dame Cathedral Basilica of Saigon. This is also the starting point of the famous Đồng Khởi Street. The square is surrounded by two remarkable architectural works: Notre-Dame Cathedral and Central Post Office.

History 

The square was originally named Place de la Cathédrale (roughly translated "Cathedral Square") dated back to the French colonial period. In 1903, the colonial government erected a bronze statue of French Catholic priest Pigneau de Behaine and juvenile Prince Nguyễn Phúc Cảnh in the center of the square. It was brought down in October 1945 leaving behind an empty statue pedestal. There was no statue on the site until 1959 under the First Republic of Vietnam, when a new statue of Our Lady of Peace was erected in honor of the Blessed Virgin Mary. The square itself was called Hòa Bình Square (literally "Peace Square"). In May 1964, the South Vietnamese government renamed it to President John F. Kennedy Square honoring the assassinated U.S. President. The current name was coined after the Fall of Saigon, literally means "Paris Commune Square".

References 

Buildings and structures in Ho Chi Minh City
Streets in Ho Chi Minh City